Deborah Bea Jacobvitz is an American ecologist. She holds the Phyllis L. Richards Endowed Professorship at University of Texas at Austin.

Early life
Jacobvitz was raised by mother Jeanne Jacobvitz and father Leonard Jacobvitz. She grew up in Albuquerque, New Mexico with three other siblings. She attended ElDorado High School and graduated with straight As.

Career
After earning her PhD, Jacobvitz joined the Department of Human Ecology, Child Development and Family Relationships at the University of Texas at Austin as an Assistant Professor. In 2008, she was appointed the chairperson of the Department of Human Development and Family Sciences at the newly established School of Human Ecology.

References

External links

Year of birth missing (living people)
Living people
Academics from New Mexico
American ecologists
Women ecologists
University of Texas at Austin faculty
University of Minnesota alumni
University of California, Berkeley alumni